A Question and Answer Guide to Astronomy is a book about astronomy and cosmology, and is intended for a general audience. The book was written by Pierre-Yves Bely, Carol Christian, and Jean-Rene Roy, and published in English by Cambridge University Press in 2010. It was originally written in French. The content within the book is written using a question and answer format. It contains some 250 questions, which The Science Teacher states each are answered with a "concise and well-formulated essay that is informative and readable." The Science Teacher review goes on to state that many of the answers given in the book are "little gems of science writing". The Science Teacher summarizes by stating that each question is likely to be thought of by a student, and that "the answers are informative, well constructed, and thorough".

The book covers information about the planets, the Earth, the Universe, practical astronomy, history, and awkward questions such as astronomy in the Bible, UFOs, and aliens. Also covered are subjects such as the Big Bang, comprehension of large numbers, and the Moon illusion.

See also
Bibliography of encyclopedias: astronomy and astronomers

References

Additional reviews

Mutel, R. L. "A question and answer guide to astronomy", Choice: Current Reviews for Academic Libraries; Jan2011, Vol. 48 Issue 5, p920-920
Whitt, April S. "A Question and Answer Guide to Astronomy", Planetarian; Sep2012, Vol. 41 Issue 3, p60-60
Mizon, Bob "A question and answer guide to astronomy", Journal of the British Astronomical Association; Jun2010, Vol. 120 Issue 3, p186-186, 1/2p
Zetie, Ken "A Question and Answer Guide to Astronomy", Contemporary Physics; Sep/Oct2011, Vol. 52 Issue 5, p482-482, 1p
"A Question and Answer Guide to Astronomy", MNASSA Monthly Notes of the Astronomical Society of Southern Africa; Aug2011, Vol. 70 Issue 7/8, p159-161, 3p

External links
 Cambridge University Press — A Question and Answer Guide to Astronomy

Astronomy books
2010 non-fiction books
Cambridge University Press books